Larry Grant may refer to:

Larry Grant (American football) (born 1985), professional football player
Larry Grant (politician) (born 1946), Idaho businessman and politician
Larry Grant (trainer) at Seagram Cup Stakes

See also
Lawrence Grant (1870-1952), English actor